Established in Benin City, Nigeria, in 2012 by Charles Oronsaye Jr., Africana Couture is a menswear bespoke brand that became famous for dressing former President Olusegun Obasanjo, Vice-president Yemi Osinbanjo, and famous stars such as Djimon Hounsou, Jim Iyke, and Ebuka Obi-Uchendu.

Advocacy Through Style  
Through its enormous social platform and fashion campaigns, Africana Couture advocates for the peace across the African continent and for the normalization of kaftans, the traditional Nigerian menswear  tunics and pants.

International Acclaim 
Africana Couture has been featured widely across major international publications including Forbes magazine and GQ magazine, where the label has been lauded as Nigeria's leading menswear brand.

References

Clothing companies of Nigeria
Benin City